Kelleth is a hamlet in Cumbria, England, containing around a dozen houses and formerly a toy factory. The oldest houses in the hamlet date as far back as the 17th century.

The hamlet has previously gone by the names "Kellath" and "Kellathe".

Geography and Land Use
Kelleth is a rural hamlet and much of the land (more than 50%) is used for farming.

Situated on the outskirts of the hamlet are 3 disused limekilns.

See also

Listed buildings in Orton, Eden

Sources

Further References and External Links
Kelleth information on UK Villages site
Kelleth information on "Geograph British Isles" site
Kelleth on "Old Cumbrian Gazetteer"

External links

Hamlets in Cumbria
Orton, Eden